This article lists the appearances of all participants in the women's tennis singles WTA Finals since the tournament's inception in 1972.

Since 2003, the tournament has pitted the top eight players on the WTA tour against each other in two groups in which they play three round-robin matches. Two players from each group advance to the semifinals, and the winners to the finals.

Participants are listed in order of number of appearances. When there are more than eight players listed for any year since 2003, it is usually due to withdrawal by one or more players because of injury. When a player withdraws early in the tournament, her place is filled by the next-highest qualifier.
 A = Alternate (did not play from the beginning; 2003–present)

See also
WTA Finals

References
ITF site
Hickok Sports site

Lists of female tennis players